Louis-Marie-Raphaël Barbier (11 March 1792 – 29 April 1852) was a physician and surgeon from Berthier-en-Haut in Lower Canada.

He was also elected to the Legislative Assembly of Lower Canada and served there from 1824 to 1827.

External links
 
 

1792 births
1852 deaths
Members of the Legislative Assembly of Lower Canada
19th-century Canadian physicians